Dino Buzzati-Traverso (14 October 1906 – 28 January 1972) was an Italian novelist, short story writer, painter and poet, as well as a journalist for Corriere della Sera. His worldwide fame is mostly due to his novel The Tartar Steppe, although he is also known for his well-received collections of short stories.

Life
Buzzati was born at San Pellegrino, Belluno, in his family's ancestral villa. Buzzati's mother, a veterinarian by profession, was Venetian and his father, a professor of international law, was from an old Bellunese family. Buzzati was the second of his parents' four children. One of his brothers was the well-known Italian geneticist Adriano Buzzati-Traverso. In 1924, he enrolled in the law faculty of the University of Milan, where his father once taught. As he was completing his studies in law, he was hired, at the age of 22, by the Milanese newspaper Corriere della Sera, where he would remain employed until his death. He began in the editorial department. Later he worked as a reporter, special correspondent, essayist, editor, and art critic. It is often said that his journalistic background informs his writing, lending even the most fantastic tales an aura of realism.

Buzzati himself commented on the connection (as cited by Lawrence Venuti):

During World War II, Buzzati served in Africa as a journalist attached to the Regia Marina. After the end of the war, Il deserto dei Tartari was published nationwide in Italy and quickly brought critical recognition and fame to the author. He married Almerina Antoniazzi in 1966. He published his last novel, Un amore, concerning love, in that year. In 1972, Buzzati died of cancer after a protracted illness.

Works summary
Buzzati began writing fiction in 1933. His works of fiction include five novels, theatre and radio plays, librettos, numerous books of short stories, and poetry. His libretti include four for operas by Luciano Chailly, as well as one for La giacca dannata by Giulio Viozzi.

He wrote a children's book La famosa invasione degli orsi in Sicilia (translated by Frances Lobb into English as The Bears' Famous Invasion of Sicily). Lemony Snicket wrote an introduction and reader's companion to a 2005 English edition.

Also an acclaimed artist, Buzzati combined his artistic and writerly exploits into making a comic book based on the myth of Orpheus, Poem Strip. As for the graphic element, he once explained that "for me, painting and writing are the same thing."

The Tartar Steppe, his most famous novel, tells the story of a military outpost that awaits a Tartar invasion. In its sentiment and its conclusions, it has been compared to existentialist works, notably Albert Camus's The Myth of Sisyphus.

His writing is sometimes cited as magical realism or social alienation. The fate of the environment and of fantasy in the face of unbridled technological progress are recurring themes. He wrote a variety of short stories featuring fantastic animals such as the bogeyman and, his own invention, the colomber (il colombre). His Sessanta racconti collection of sixty stories, which won the Strega Prize in 1958, features elements of science fiction, fantasy, and horror.

Bibliography
 Bàrnabo delle montagne (1933). Barnabo of the Mountains, trans. Lawrence Venuti, included in The Siren (1984)
 Il segreto del Bosco Vecchio (1935). The Secret of the Old Woods
 Il deserto dei Tartari (1940). The Tartar Steppe, trans. Stuart C. Hood (Secker & Warburg, 1952); also as The Stronghold, trans. Lawrence Venuti (New York Review Books, 2023)
 I sette messaggeri (1942, short stories). The Seven Messengers
 La famosa invasione degli orsi in Sicilia (1945). The Bears' Famous Invasion of Sicily, trans. Frances Lobb (Pantheon, 1947)
 In quel preciso momento (1950)
 Il crollo della Baliverna (1954)
 Sessanta racconti (1958, short stories). Sixty Stories
 Il grande ritratto (1960). Larger than Life, trans. Henry Reed (Secker & Warburg, 1962)
 Un amore (1963). A Love Affair, trans. Joseph Green (Farrar Straus, 1964)
 Il capitano Pic e altre poesie (1965, poetry)
 Cacciatori di vecchio (1966, novel)
 Il colombre (1966, short stories)
 Poema a fumetti (1969, comic book). Poem Strip, trans. Marina Harss (New York Review Books, 2009)
 Il reggimento parte all'alba (1985, short stories). The Regiment Leaves at Dawn
Compilations in English
 Catastrophe and Other Stories, trans. Judith Landry and Cynthia Jolly (Calder, 1965)
 Restless Nights: Selected Stories of Dino Buzzati, trans. Lawrence Venuti (North Point Press, 1983)
 The Siren: A Selection from Dino Buzzati, trans. Lawrence Venuti (Farrar, Straus & Giroux, 1984)

Awards and honors 
 1951: Gargano Prize, for In quel preciso momento
 1954: Naples Prize, for Il crollo della Baliverna
 1958: Strega Prize, for Sessanta racconti
 1969: Paese Sera Prize, for Poema a fumetti
 1970: All’Amalia Prize
 1970: Mario Massai Prize

References

 Giuseppe Leone, "Dino Buzzati e le grandi 'costruzioni' letterarie – La fortezza di Bastiani non è Il castello di Kafka", Il Punto Stampa, Lecco, Italy, April 1997.
 Luis Montiel (2010), “Una meditatio mortis contemporánea. La reflexión de Dino Buzzati sobre la caducidad de la vida humana”. Medicina e historia, 2/2010, 1–15.

External links
  
 
  
 Il coraggio della bontà – Dino Buzzati e don Zeno Saltini: cronaca di un'amicizia
 Dino Buzzati et la Ville - Dino Buzzati and the city, the webpage of french artist Alexandre Nezeys Tacconi

Dino Buzzati
1906 births
1972 deaths
People from Belluno
Italian atheists
Italian comics artists
Italian comics writers
Italian male short story writers
Italian sports journalists
Italian male journalists
Italian children's writers
Strega Prize winners
Deaths from pancreatic cancer
Italian opera librettists
Deaths from cancer in Lombardy
Writers who illustrated their own writing
20th-century Italian novelists
20th-century Italian male writers
20th-century Italian dramatists and playwrights
Italian male novelists
Italian male dramatists and playwrights
20th-century Italian short story writers
Magic realism writers